List of Metro Rail stations may refer to:

List of Buffalo Metro Rail stations
List of Metro Rail (Los Angeles County) stations
List of METRORail stations